The Clark County Regional Flood Control District (CCRFCD) was created in 1985 by the Nevada Legislature allowing Clark County to provide broad solutions to flooding problems. The District has developed plans and so far successfully continued working on a 50-year program to eliminate most flooding from a 100-year flood in the populated areas for which the CCRFCD is responsible.

History
Voters in 1986 approved a quarter cent sales tax to fund construction of regional flood control facilities. The first project began in 1988.
As of June 2013, a total of $1.7 bill was spent on flood control, including construction of 90 detention basins and approximately 581 miles of channels and underground storm drains. To date, 51 square miles have been removed from federally identified FEMA flood zones, saving residents millions of dollars per year in flood insurance premiums.

The Regional Flood Control District is more than 75 percent complete with the Master Plan. Another 31 detention basins are planned, along with 226 miles of conveyance.

The District's website, provides citizens information about the District and the progress of flood control in Clark County. The site also gives current rainfall information on approximately 189 locations throughout the county.

The District produces a 30-minute television news program six times per year that updates the community about the progress of flood control and provides information about flash flood safety. The program airs about 40 times per month on Cox Cable channels 2 and 4, as well as on stations in Laughlin and Mesquite.

District direction for providing protection
Since Las Vegas is located in a basin with a single outlet, the Las Vegas Wash, all rain runoff drains to the east side of the basin where it will eventually be deposited into Lake Mead. Rainfall in the surrounding mountain ranges, can cause flooding in the area as water flows off the mountains onto the valley floor.  The area is also subject to localized weather events.  It is possible for an area to receive heavy rainfall in a short time, while nearby areas as close as one or two miles (3 km) away receive little or no rain. Additional history about past flood events is available as well as some historical rainfall data.

The increase of hardscape as the valley has developed has contributed to an increase of runoff over time.

To help alleviate the damage caused by flooding, the Clark County Regional Flood Control District has spent millions of dollars to build detention basins and concrete drainage channels throughout the area. The belief is that these structures will control the flow of water when there is storm runoff and reduce flooding in areas below the basins and near the channels and washes.

Given the topography of the area, some areas may not be fixable.  One example being the Flamingo Wash where the channel overflows into the Imperial Palace parking garage during flash flooding events.

How growth has affected plans and development
With the rapid growth occurring in the valley, the plan and finances have not been able to keep up. As a result, developers are deciding to build in areas not yet protected by detention basins or other control measures. This is causing many new home buyers to deal with damage or severe runoff on local streets which are used as flood channels when other facilities are not available.

How weather creates problems
Heavy rainfall can cause localized flash flooding. A thunderstorm hit the northwest part of the city of Las Vegas for two hours in August 2003, causing some hail damage and considerable water damage. Heavy localized flooding occurred, with property damage reaching into the hundreds of thousands of dollars. In February 2005, the southwest part of the Vegas Valley was hard hit by flooding from the mountain rainfall runoff. Higher than average precipitation that same winter was responsible for significant damage in Mesquite and Overton which, as of that point in time, had not received much attention since their populations were so much smaller than the Las Vegas valley area.

Event detection and notification
In addition to building and maintaining flood control projects, the District also operates a Flood Threat Recognition System of ALERT rain and stream gage, with the cooperation of the United States Geological Survey and the National Weather Service. This system collects hydrometeorologic data primarily for the purpose of detecting situations which could cause flooding.

Major facilities

Detention basins

Angel Park Detention Basin
Anthem Detention Basin
Black Mountain Detention Basin
Caballo Basin
Horse Diamond Basin
Cheyenne Peaking Basin
Confluence Detention Basin
Desert Inn Detention Basin
East C-1 Detention Basin
Equestrian Detention Basin
Fort Apache Detention Basin
Gowan Central Detention Basin
Gowan South Detention Basin
Indian Springs Detention Basin
Kyle Canyon Detention Basin
The Lakes Detention Basin
Lone Mountain Detention Basin
Lower Blue Diamond Detention Basin
Lower Duck Creek Detention Basin
McCullough Hills Detention Basin
Meadows Detention Basin
Mission Hills Detention Basin
Oakey Detention Basin
Pioneer Detention Basin
Pittman East Detention Basin
Pittman Park Detention Basin
Red Rock Detention Basin
R-4 Detention Basin
Tropicana Wash Detention Basin
Upper Flamingo Detention Basin
Van Buskirk Detention Basin
Vandenberg Detention Basin
Veterans Detention Basin
Windmill Wash Detention Basin
Upper Duck Creek Detention Basin

Flood channels

Beltway Channel 
Duck Creek Wash
Flamingo Wash
Halfway Wash
Las Vegas Wash
Naples Channel
Pittman Wash
Sloan Channel
Tropicana Wash

See also
 Surface-water hydrology

References

External links
 Clark County Regional Flood Control District website

1985 establishments in Nevada
Government agencies established in 1985
Government of Clark County, Nevada
Las Vegas Valley